The following is a list of populated islands of the Great Lakes and connecting rivers. The islands listed have a specified year-round population of over 50 residents. 

Many islands are popular tourist destinations, and experience a sharp population increase during peak travel seasons.

In 2017, the Great Lakes Island Coalition was founded, a group dedicated to representing the interests of Great Lakes island residents. At an annual summit, related issues of discussion include environmental issues facing the Great Lakes island inhabitants, such as water levels and quality, invasive species, and even government policy topics, such as nuclear water storage and shipment in the Great Lakes region.

Ontario, Canada

Algonquin Island

Part of the city of Toronto, Algonquin Island is one of the Toronto Islands, an archipelago in Toronto Harbour. Unlike most of the archipelago, which is made up of parkland and amusement facilities, Algonquin Island is residential.

Amherst Island

Amherst Island is, at 70 square kilometers, the largest island wholly within Lake Ontario (Wolfe Island is larger, but the eastern end of the island is in the St. Lawrence River). Amherst Island has a year-round population of 450, which grows slightly in the summer. The island, which is served by a ferry out of Millhaven, is entirely rural, and is located in Loyalist Township, Lennox and Addington County, Ontario, Canada.

Barrie Island

The municipality of Gordon/Barrie Island is a township in Manitoulin District in Lake Huron in north central Ontario, Canada. The island has a significant summer recreational population. It is connected to Manitoulin Island by Highway 540A, which crosses the water via a causeway at the narrowest part of the strait.

Bois Blanc Island

Bois Blanc Island is located in the Detroit River. It was previously the site of the Boblo Island Amusement Park. It is accessed by private ferry from Amherstburg, Ontario and has a winter population of 50 - 60.

Centre Island

Centre Island is the largest of the Toronto Islands, an archipelago located in Toronto's harbour on Lake Ontario. Most of the islands' residences and businesses were demolished beginning in 1955 in favor of parkland and other recreational facilities.  A year-round community of approximately 260 homes, concentrated at the eastern end of the island chain on Ward's Island and Algonquin Island, remains.

Cockburn Island

Cockburn Island is an island in the Canadian province of Ontario, located in the Manitoulin District. Most of the island is incorporated as the municipal township of Cockburn Island.  While having a low permanent population, its population grows significantly in the summer, to about 200 residents.

Manitoulin Island

Manitoulin Island is a Canadian island in Lake Huron, and is the largest island in a freshwater lake in the world. It has two incorporated towns, and eight townships with a population of 13,000, thus making it the most populous island in the Great Lakes.

Pelee Island

Pelee Island is the largest island in Lake Erie, and is the southernmost populated place in Canada. It has a year-round population of 170 with much higher numbers in summer.

St. Joseph Island

St. Joseph Island is a Canadian Island in Lake Huron, and is the second largest island in Lake Huron. It has a year-round population of around 2000, and is connected to the mainland by the Bernt Gilbertson Bridge spanning the North Channel of Lake Huron along Highway 548.

Walpole Island

Walpole Island (Bkejwanong) lies on the Canadian side of the St. Clair River delta. It is the main part of Walpole Island 46 Indian reserve and has a population over 2,200. It neighbors the U.S. Harsens Island. It is accessible by bridge from the Canadian mainland and ferry from the U.S.

Wolfe Island

Wolfe Island is an island located at the entrance to the Saint Lawrence River in Lake Ontario near Kingston, Ontario. The resident population is approximately 1400 people, but this number can double or triple during the summer months.

United States

Michigan

Beaver Island

Beaver Island is the largest island in Lake Michigan and part of the Beaver Island archipelago of Michigan in the United States. It lies about 32 miles (50 km) from the city of Charlevoix on the mainland, and can be reached by air or boat. St. James is the name of the unincorporated community on the island, which has a population of 551.

Bois Blanc Island

Bois Blanc Island is located in Lake Huron southeast of Mackinac Island and almost due north of the city of Cheboygan, Michigan. Plaunt Transportation is the sole provider of ferry services for the island.

Drummond Island

Drummond Island is one of the largest islands in Lake Huron, and consists of Drummond Township, Michigan. The unincorporated area had a population of 992 residents as of the 2000 Census. The island lies along the Canada–US border, and is adjacent to Manitoulin Island.

Grand Island (Michigan)

Grand Island in Lake Superior has a population of 47 according to the 2010 Census. The island is in the U.S. state of Michigan's Upper Peninsula. Most of the island is a federal park.

Grosse Ile

Grosse Ile lies in the Detroit River, downriver from Detroit. It is part of Wayne County, Michigan and had a population over 10,000. The largest island in the Detroit River, it is one of the most populous islands in the Great Lakes system. It is reached by two bridges or a small airport.

Harsens Island

Harsens Island is an island in the St. Clair River delta on the U.S. border opposite Canada's Walpole Island. It has a population of over 1,200 year-round residents and perhaps 5,000 in summer. It is served by Champion's Auto Ferry.

Mackinac Island

Mackinac Island is an island and resort area covering 4.35 square miles in Lake Huron, located between the state of Michigan's Upper and Lower Peninsulas

Neebish Island

Neebish Island is an island in the U.S. state of Michigan in the St. Marys River between the United States and the Canadian province of Ontario. There is one store and one church on the island, and a car ferry service operates April 1 to January 15.

Sugar Island

Sugar Island is an island in the U.S. state of Michigan in the St. Marys River between the United States and the Canadian province of Ontario. The entire island constitutes Sugar Island Township in Chippewa County at the eastern tip of the Upper Peninsula. According to the 2000 census, there were 683 people living on the island.

New York

Cayuga Island

Cayuga Island is part of the city of Niagara Falls, New York, located in the Niagara River several miles upstream of the falls themselves. Part of the LaSalle neighborhood, the island contains a mix of parkland and middle-class housing.

Grand Island (New York)

Located in the Niagara River, Grand Island is located in Erie County, New York and is a suburb of the city of Buffalo with a population of 20,374 as of the 2010 Census.

Ohio

Kelleys Island

Kelleys Island is both a village in Erie County, Ohio, United States, and the island which it fully occupies in Lake Erie. 
 The population is 367.

Middle Bass Island

Middle Bass Island is an Ohio island in western Lake Erie with a year-round population of 95. It lies near Kelleys Island and South Bass Island (Put-In-Bay). The island has an airport and is a stop on the inter-island ferry.

South Bass Island

South Bass Island is located in western Lake Erie, and a part of Ottawa County, Ohio. It contains the village of Put-in-Bay, which has a population of 128 as of the 2000 Census. Ferry service connects the community with Catawba Island, Kelleys Island, Port Clinton, and Sandusky, Ohio.

Wisconsin

Madeline Island

Madeline Island is located in Lake Superior and contains the town of La Pointe, with a population of 246. The island has a rich history and was once the home of a French fur trading post.

Washington Island

Washington Island is located about 7 miles northeast of the tip of Door Peninsula in Door County, Wisconsin. The island has a year-round population of 708 people as of the 2010 Census. The unincorporated community of Detroit Harbor is located on the island.

See also

Islands of the Great Lakes — all the islands.
Lists of Islands of the Great Lakes
List of islands in lakes
List of islands by population

References

External links

Island Directory @ United Nations Environment Programme

World island information @ WorldIslandInfo.com
What it's like to live on an island in the Great Lakes

Great Lakes, Populated
Great Lakes, Populated
Populated islands
Islands
Islands
Islands
Islands
Islands
Islands, Great Lakes
Islands
 Islands

sq:Lista e ishujve të Ameriës Veriore